The borough of Kråkerøy is an administrative region in Fredrikstad, Norway.

References

Populated places in Østfold
Fredrikstad